Khuldat is a rural locality (a selo) in Dzhidinsky District, Republic of Buryatia, Russia. The population was 142 as of 2010.

Geography 
Khuldat is located 55 km southwest of Petropavlovka (the district's administrative centre) by road. Naryn is the nearest rural locality.

References 

Rural localities in Dzhidinsky District